The What Makes You Country Tour was the sixth headlining concert tour by American country music artist Luke Bryan. In support of his sixth studio album What Makes You Country (2017), it began on February 18, 2018, in Springfield, Missouri, and concluded on October 26, 2018, in Detroit, Michigan. Stadium dates included Sam Hunt on the bill and played historic venues such as Boston's Fenway Park, Chicago's Wrigley Field and the tour was be the first country concert to be held at Los Angeles's Dodger Stadium.

Setlist
This set list represents the September 8, 2018, show in Dallas, it does not represent the full-length of the tour.

 "Country Girl (Shake It for Me)"
 "Huntin', Fishin' and Lovin' Every Day"
 "I Don't Want This Night to End"
 "This Is How We Roll"
 "All My Friends Say"
 "Light It Up"
 "Someone Else Calling You Baby"
 "Most People Are Good"
 "Kiss Tomorrow Goodbye"
 "Sunrise, Sunburn, Sunset"
 "What Makes You Country"
 "Kick the Dust Up"
 "Strip It Down"
 "Drunk on You"
 "Crash My Party"
 "Home Alone Tonight" / "Do I"
 "Girls Like You" (Maroon 5 cover)
 "Good Directions" (Billy Currington cover)
 "Dixieland Delight" (Alabama cover)
 "Drink a Beer"
 "Roller Coaster"
 "Play It Again"
 "Rain Is a Good Thing"
 "Move"
 "That's My Kind of Night"

Tour dates

Box office score data

Personnel
Michael Carter – band leader, electric guitar
Jason Faussett – acoustic guitar, piano
James Cook – bass guitar 
Kent Slucher  – drums
Kevin Arrowsmith  – fiddle, electric guitar
Dave Ristrum – banjo

References

 2018 concert tours
 Luke Bryan concert tours